New Jersey Transit operates or contracts operation of the following routes within Middlesex, Monmouth, and Morris  counties. All routes are exact fare lines.

Metropark loops
These routes serve office parks around Metropark are operated from Suburban Transit New Brunswick garage. All routes operate during peak hours only.

Middlesex County local routes
These routes are operated from Suburban Transit's New Brunswick garage. Below is the full route.

Plainfield local service
This route is operated from Suburban Transit's New Brunswick garage.

Monmouth County local service
These lines are operated by Transdev (formerly Veolia Transportation) from its garage in Neptune, New Jersey. Below is the full route except for branching.

Morris local service

NJ Transit operated
Most of these routes were renumbered from MCM- routes (with some modifications) in October 2010 and were formerly operated as contract service by PABCO Transit. Service is subsidised by the Morris County Board of County Commissioners and operates under the NJ Transit Morris, Inc. subsidiary out of Morris Garage. All routes do not operate on Sundays.

Contract operations
This route, originally split from the 966, was operated by Saddle River Trails. It is now operated by Morris Garage, and is part of the WHEELS program. It operates between Convent Station and the points listed below, weekday rush hours only:

Former routes
This list includes routes that have been discontinued. The "M" routes pre-date the changeover to 800-series routes, so they are shown with their old denomination in the M-series.

External links
New Jersey Transit - Bus
Unofficial New Jersey Transit bus map

References

 800
Lists of New Jersey bus routes